Dylan C. Smith is the co-founder and Chief Financial Officer of Box.

Early life
Smith graduated from Duke University with a Bachelor's degree in economics.  While at Duke, Smith was a member of Sigma Phi Epsilon.

Career
In 2005, while in college, Smith co-founded Box, along with childhood friend Aaron Levie. Smith invested $20,000 of online poker earnings as seed capital into the company.  Smith took a year off from Duke to focus on the company before returning to finish his degree, while still serving as CFO.

Personal
Smith appeared on a 3rd-season episode of reality tv dating show The Millionaire Matchmaker, which aired in 2010.

Smith married Yael Goshen in 2013.

References

Duke University Trinity College of Arts and Sciences alumni
Living people
People from Mercer Island, Washington
1985 births
American chief financial officers
21st-century American businesspeople